Ashar is a rural locality (a selo) and the administrative centre of Asharsky Selsoviet, Kurakhsky District, Republic of Dagestan, Russia. The population was 565 as of 2010. There are 7 streets.

Geography 
Ashar is located 12 km northwest of Kurakh (the district's administrative centre) by road. Kurakh and Khyurekhyur are the nearest rural localities.

Nationalities 
Lezgins live there.

References 

Rural localities in Kurakhsky District